The semitendinosus is a long superficial muscle in the back of the thigh. It is so named because it has a very long tendon of insertion. It lies posteromedially in the thigh, superficial to the semimembranosus.

Structure
The semitendinosus, remarkable for the great length of its tendon of insertion, is situated at the posterior and medial aspect of the thigh.

It arises from the lower and medial impression on the upper part of the tuberosity of the ischium, by a tendon common to it and the long head of the biceps femoris; it also arises from an aponeurosis which connects the adjacent surfaces of the two muscles to the extent of about 7.5 cm. from their origin.

The muscle is fusiform and ends a little below the middle of the thigh in a long round tendon which lies along the medial side of the popliteal fossa; it then curves around the medial condyle of the tibia and passes over the medial collateral ligament of the knee-joint, from which it is separated by a bursa, and is inserted into the upper part of the medial surface of the body of the tibia, nearly as far forward as its anterior crest.

The semitendinosus is more superficial than the semimembranosus (with which it shares very close insertion and attachment points).  However, because the semimembranosus is wider and flatter than the semitendinosus, it is still possible to palpate the semimembranosus directly.

At its insertion it gives off from its lower border a prolongation to the deep fascia of the leg and lies behind the tendon of the sartorius, and below that of the gracilis, to which it is united.  These three tendons form what is known as the pes anserinus, so named because it looks like the foot of a goose.

Innervation
A lower motor neuron exits to the sacral plexus exiting through the spinal levels L5-S2.  From the sacral plexus, the lower motor neuron travels down the sciatic nerve.  The sciatic nerve branches into the deep fibular nerve and the tibial nerve.  The tibial nerve innervates the semitendinosus as well as the other hamstring muscles, the semimembranosus and biceps femoris.

Function
The semitendinosus muscle is one of three hamstring muscles that are located at the back of the thigh. The other two are the semimembranosus muscle and the biceps femoris. The semitendinosus muscle lies between the other two. These three muscles work collectively to flex the knee and extend the hip.

The muscle also helps to medially rotate the tibia on the femur when the knee is flexed and medially rotate the femur when the hip is extended. It counteracts forward bending at the hips as well.

Clinical significance 
Along with patellar ligament and quadriceps femoris, semitendinosus/gracilis (STG) tendon autografts has been used commonly and successfully for anterior cruciate ligament reconstruction. Sufficient graft size could typically be obtained using either a semitendinosus/gracilis tendon double-bundle technique, or a quadruple-bundle technique using a single tendon.

Additional images

See also

Semimembranosus
Biceps femoris

References

External links

 knee/surface/surface4 at the Dartmouth Medical School's Department of Anatomy
PTCentral

Hip extensors
Knee flexors
Knee medial rotators
Thigh muscles
Posterior compartment of thigh
Muscles of the lower limb
Hamstring